Kentucky Route 445 (KY 445) is a  state highway in the U.S. state of Kentucky. The highway travels through mostly urban areas of Campbell County. Most of its length is in the city limits of Fort Thomas, though the eastern segment is on the northern edges of Cold Spring.

Route description
KY 445 begins at an intersection with KY 8 (Mary Ingles Highway) in the northern part of Cold Spring, within the northern part of Campbell County. It travels to the northwest along the Ohio River along a former section of KY-8. After crossing under I-275, it turns west along River Road and continues into Fort Thomas. It passes the Tower Park Soccer Field and curves to the west-northwest. It begins a brief concurrency with KY 1120 (South Ft. Thomas Avenue). The two highways travel to the southwest and curve to the south-southwest. When KY 445 splits off, it travels to the west-northwest and meets its eastern terminus, an intersection with U.S. Route 27 (US 27; Alexandria Pike). This intersection is on the eastern edge of the Highland Country Club golf course.

Major intersections

See also

References

0445
Transportation in Campbell County, Kentucky